Arorae Airport  is the airport serving Arorae, Kiribati. It is located in the north of the island, north of the village of Tamaroa.

The airport is served by Air Kiribati from Tabiteuea North Airport, which is connected directly with the international airport at South Tarawa, but lands at Tamana too on its way from Arorae back to Tabiteuea North.

Airlines and destinations

Air Kiribati connection with Tamana
Landing at Tamana is not a fuel stop: Since this is the only time in the week Tamana is served, passengers can get in or get out there. Thus, note that if one wants to fly from Tamana to Arorae, he cannot do anything else than make the big detour via Tabiteuea North (which lies much farther from Tamana than Arorae does), and wait a full week there, until the next flight to Arorae (because from Tabiteuea North, the plane continues its way to Bonriki International Airport).

Notes

Airports in Kiribati
Arorae